Christopher "Chris" Brook (born 1979) is an American lawyer and jurist. 
Judge Chris Brook spent his formative years in Raleigh, attending Daniels Middle School and Broughton High School. He received his undergraduate and Juris Doctor (J.D.) degrees from the University of North Carolina at Chapel Hill. At Carolina Law, he was managing editor of the North Carolina Journal of International Law and Commercial Regulation and director of the school's Pro Bono Program. From 2007 to 2011, Judge Brook served as an adjunct professor at Carolina Law.

Judge Brook first practiced law in the Raleigh office of Cranfill, Sumner & Hartzog. He then worked as a staff attorney at the Southern Coalition for Social Justice in Durham, North Carolina. From 2012 through his appointment to the Court of Appeals by Governor Roy Cooper, Judge Brook was the legal director of the American Civil Liberties Union of North Carolina. Judge Brook was admitted to practice in North Carolina state courts as well as each federal district court in the state, the United States Court of Appeals for the Fourth Circuit, and the United States Supreme Court. He successfully litigated matters in both state and federal court, including before a rare sitting of the full Fourth Circuit.

Active in the local community, Judge Brook served as Chair of the Board of the Orange County Partnership for Young Children and Vice-Chair of the Board of Transplanting Tradition Community Farm. In 2012, he was a founding member of a monthly housing law clinic at El Centro Hispano in Durham. Judge Brook also served on the Size of the School Task Force and Pro Bono Alumni Board at Carolina Law, and as an attorney volunteer at the Compass Center for Women and Families. He is the incoming Chair of the North Carolina Bar Association's Constitutional Rights and Responsibilities Section.

Judge Brook has received numerous recognitions for his contributions to the community and the legal profession in the state. He was inducted into the James E. and Carolyn B. Davis Society upon his graduation from Carolina Law and was subsequently honored as the school's Outstanding Recent Graduate. In 2016, the North Carolina Association of Women Attorneys awarded him with the Gwyneth B. Davis Public Service Award. Judge Brook was also the winner of the North Carolina Justice Center's Defender of Justice Litigation Award in 2017.

He was appointed to serve on the North Carolina Court of Appeals by North Carolina Governor Roy Cooper in 2019. Brook was then a 2020 candidate for the North Carolina Court of Appeals.  In an upset, he lost his bid for a full term in the 2020 general election to Wake County District Court Judge Jefferson G. Griffin.

References

External links
Meet Judge Chris Brook
Campaign Website, Judge Chris Brook

Living people
North Carolina Court of Appeals judges
North Carolina lawyers
University of North Carolina School of Law alumni
North Carolina Democrats
1979 births